Uncial 097 (in the Gregory-Aland numbering), α 1003 (Soden), is a Greek uncial manuscript of the New Testament, dated palaeographically to the 7th-century.

Description 

The codex contains a small part of the Acts of the Apostles 13:39-46, on one parchment leaf (26 cm by 21 cm). The text is written in two columns per page, 18 lines per page, in large uncial letters. It is a palimpsest, the upper text was written in Georgian, in the 10th century.

Text 

The Greek text of this codex is mixed, but predominate the Byzantine element. Aland placed it with some hesitation in Category III (Category V?).

History 

Currently it is dated by the INTF to the 7th-century.

The manuscript was examined by Constantin von Tischendorf, who published its text in facsimile edition. It was again examined by Kurt Treu.

The codex is located now at the Russian National Library (Gr. 18) in Saint Petersburg.

See also 

 List of New Testament uncials
 Textual criticism

References

Further reading 
 Constantin von Tischendorf, Monumenta sacra inedita I (Leipzig: 1855), pp. 39-40.
 Kurt Treu, Die griechischen Handschriften des Neuen Testaments in der UdSSR; eine systematische Auswertung des Texthandschriften in Leningrad, Moskau, Kiev, Odessa, Tbilisi und Erevan, Texte und Untersuchungen 91 (Berlin, 1966), pp. 36-37.

Greek New Testament uncials
7th-century biblical manuscripts
Palimpsests
National Library of Russia collection